Colom is a Catalan surname meaning "dove". Notable people with the surname include:

Álvaro Colom (1951-2023), Guatemalan politician
Antoni Lluis Adrover Colom, known as Tuni (born 1982), Spanish professional footballer
Antonio Colom (born 1978), Spanish cyclist
Enrique Colom (born 1941), Spanish theologian
Joan Colom (1921–2017), Catalan photographer
Josep Colom (born 1947), Spanish pianist
Josep Melcior Prat i Colom (1780–1855), Catalan nationalist politician and writer
Manuel Colom Argueta (1932–1979), Guatemalan politician
Quino Colom (born 1988), Andorran basketball player
Ulpiano Colóm, Mayor of Ponce, Puerto Rico, during part of 1898

Catalan-language surnames